Further Seems Forever is an American rock band formed in 1998 in Pompano Beach, Florida. Over its initial eight-year run the band experienced several lineup changes, resulting in a different lead vocalist performing on each of their first three studio albums. Original singer Chris Carrabba recorded The Moon Is Down (2001) with the group before leaving to start Dashboard Confessional. He was replaced by Jason Gleason, who performed on How to Start a Fire (2003) but left the band the following year. Former Sense Field vocalist Jon Bunch joined Further Seems Forever for Hide Nothing (2004). The band broke up in 2006 but reunited four years later with Carrabba on vocals. Their fourth studio album, Penny Black, was released in 2012.

The band's music is often classified as indie rock and is frequently associated with the emo genre. They have also been classified as a Christian rock act due to the individual band members' religious beliefs, frequent themes of Christianity in their lyrics, their association with the predominantly Christian Tooth & Nail Records label, and their performances at Christian-themed festivals such as Cornerstone and Furnace Fest. Despite these associations, the group has claimed not to be an explicitly Christian band, but rather a rock band with Christian members.

History

1998–2001: Formation, Chris Carrabba, and The Moon Is Down 
The band formed in 1998 in Pompano Beach, Florida after the breakup of the Christian hardcore band Strongarm. Strongarm guitarists Josh Colbert and Nick Dominguez, bassist Chad Neptune, and drummer Steve Kleisath recruited former Vacant Andys and Red Letter Day vocalist Chris Carrabba to form Further Seems Forever. The first song the new band released was "Vengeance Factor" on the Deep Elm Records compilation An Ocean of Doubt: The Emo Diaries, Chapter Four, which contributed to the band's association with the emo genre. Their first release was a split EP with fellow Floridians Recess Theory entitled From the 27th State, released by Takehold Records, and soon the band had signed a recording contract with Seattle-based Christian label Tooth and Nail Records. By 2000, however, Carrabba had begun working on his own project Dashboard Confessional and recorded the album The Swiss Army Romance, essentially a solo release which he considered too personal for Further Seems Forever. At this time the band struggled with interpersonal squabbles and difficulties touring, as Dominguez had a young family and was reluctant to tour outside the state. This forced the group to search for several fill-in guitarists to replace him on tour. After returning from a solo tour in August 2000 Carrabba announced that he was leaving the group in order to focus on Dashboard Confessional full-time:

"I knew the only chance I had to make it in the music scene was go out there and do all the legwork to push yourself and make yourself known...I was willing to do that and they weren't. They were playing music around their jobs, not as their jobs. It was like, if we're gonna be a band, let's be a band. This isn't going to happen by itself."

Despite this decision, Carrabba joined the band the following month to record their debut album The Moon Is Down, released in 2001 by Tooth & Nail. Relations between him and the other band members remained amicable, and Further Seems Forever would later open for Dashboard Confessional on several occasions.

2001–2004: Jason Gleason and How to Start a Fire 
After Carrabba's departure the band recruited Jason Gleason of Affinity as their new vocalist. With Gleason they re-recorded their cover version of "Say It Ain't So" for the compilation Rock Music: A Tribute to Weezer with Gleason's version appearing on the CD and Carraba's version appearing as a vinyl only bonus track. They also recorded a cover of "Bye Bye Bye" for the compilation Punk Goes Pop.

In August 2001, the band played Furnace Fest, and next embarked on a tour of the United States' East Coast and Midwest with Ultimate Fakebook,  As Friends Rust and Keepsake in August and September 2001. The tour was cut short, however, following the September 11, 2001 attacks in New York City. Further Seems Forever and As Friends Rust cancelled the last five dates of the tour as a result, since they were playing in the vicinity of New York, culminating in New York City itself on September 14, 2001. In December 2001, they toured around Florida with Dashboard Confessional, The Rocking Horse Winner, Fairweather and Seville as part of the Pompano on the Go Tour.

In 2003, Dominguez then left the group to pursue a record label venture, Pop Up Record. He ran the label with Derick Cordoba, who replaced him in Further Seems Forever. This lineup recorded the band's second album How to Start a Fire, released in 2003, and supported it with a national touring schedule. In February 2003, the band toured with Elliott, The Early November and Salem. In 2003, Further Seems Forever signed with Undecided Records to finance their own imprint record label Pompano Basic, with plans to release a compilation of rare and unreleased material. The release took much longer to complete and was ultimately released bundled with a live DVD as The Final Curtain in April 2007, by which time Undecided Records had changed name to 567 Records.

In early 2004, as work on a third album was beginning, the group had a falling out with Gleason which resulted in his departure. In a 2006 interview he blamed the split on "completely irrational behavior on a daily basis. Mistrust. Fights. Anger. Jealousy. A very unhealthy relationship." Gleason went on to form ActionReaction in 2005 with his wife Crissie "Bella" Verhagen and released the album Three is the Magic Number in 2006.

2004–2006: Jon Bunch, Hide Nothing, and breakup 
To replace Gleason the band recruited vocalist Jon Bunch of the recently disbanded Sense Field. With Bunch, they released the album Hide Nothing (2004) and continued to tour internationally. The band teamed up with Brandtson, The Kicks, Moments in Grace and Salem for the "Hide Nothing Tour", which spanned from August 22 to October 4, 2004. The tour took the bands through the United States' West Coast (including a date in Western Canada), the Midwest and the East Coast. The band next partnered with Sparta, Copeland and Sunshine for another American and Canadian tour which spanned from November 5 to December 6, 2004.

From February 15 to March 14, 2005, the band toured the United States with The Starting Line, Days Away and JamisonParker. On April 5, 2005, the band released the acoustic EP Hope Against Hope. On April 30, 2005, the band played a reunion show with the original members, including Carrabba and Dominguez, at The Bamboozle, at which they performed The Moon Is Down in its entirety. With Bunch back on vocals, Further Seems Forever toured Europe during May and June 2005, joined by bass guitarist Thomas Rankine (formerly of As Friends Rust and Salem).

In November 2005, they announced a hiatus, which was followed by an announcement in January 2006 that their upcoming tour of the United States and Canada with Bunch would be their final performances, as the members' families and other commitments had eclipsed their interests in the band. As Neptune stated:
"As I sit here reflecting back on my time with FSF, saying to myself 'what happens when your dreams have come true already?' Well my answer is 'it probably wasn't my dream all along.' Sure maybe it was part of my calling but the truth is that making a family has been the goal ever since I can remember. My family is what I live for now and I am very glad to do so."

Tooth & Nail released a "best of" retrospective album that April entitled Hope This Finds You Well, and the band's farewell performance occurred June 17, 2006 at The Masquerade in Atlanta, Georgia. This performance was recorded and released as a live album and DVD by 567 Records in April 2007, entitled The Final Curtain.

2007–2010: Post-breakup activity 
Following the band's breakup Bunch and Cordoba formed Fields Forever, a duo project performing acoustic renditions of Further Seems Forever and Sense Field songs which toured across Europe. Other members went on to other projects, with Kleisath joined a group called En Masse in early 2006 and Cordoba joining Kicked Out Heel Drag in early 2007.

2010–present: Reunion with Carrabba 
Further Seems Forever reunited with original singer Chris Carrabba in August 2010. Further Seems Forever and Dashboard Confessional both played the Groezrock festival in April 2011. The band's fourth studio album, Penny Black, was released in October 2012 through Rise Records.

In August 2015, it was announced that Gleason had rejoined the band.

Former frontman Jon Bunch died on January 31, 2016, in Irvine, California at the age of 45.

In the Fall of 2021, the band played the Furnace Festival with the Gleason-era lineup.

On February 2, 2022, it was announced that Further Seems Forever would reunite with the original lineup to celebrate 20 years of The Moon Is Down at the Breakfast in Franklin, Tennessee.

Personnel 
Current members
Chris Carrabba – lead vocals, keyboards, piano , backing vocals 
Josh Colbert – lead guitar 
Nick Dominguez – rhythm guitar , lead guitar 
Chad Neptune – bass guitar 
Steve Kleisath – drums 

Former members
Jason Gleason – lead vocals , backing vocals 
Derick Cordoba - rhythm guitar, lead guitar 
Jake Clark - bass 
Thomas Rankine - bass 
Tom English - guitars 
Ian Sirianni - guitars (touring) 
Brandon Swanson - guitars (touring) 
Ian Fowles - guitars (touring) 
Jon Bunch – lead vocals 

Timeline

Discography

The discography of Further Seems Forever consists of four studio albums, one live album, one compilation album, one EP, one single, and four music videos.

Studio albums

Live albums

Compilation albums

Extended plays

Singles

Music videos

Other appearances 
The following Further Seems Forever songs were released on compilation albums. This is not an exhaustive list; songs that were first released on the band's albums, EPs, and singles are not included.

References

External links

 

 
Emo musical groups from Florida
Christian rock groups from Florida
Musical groups established in 1998
Musical groups disestablished in 2006
Musical groups reestablished in 2010
Tooth & Nail Records artists
Undecided Records artists
Musical groups from Pompano Beach, Florida